Terms of Endearment is a 1983 American family comedy-drama film directed, written, and produced by James L. Brooks, adapted from Larry McMurtry's 1975 novel of the same name. It stars Debra Winger, Shirley MacLaine, Jack Nicholson, Danny DeVito, Jeff Daniels, and John Lithgow. The film covers 30 years of the relationship between Aurora Greenway (MacLaine) and her daughter Emma (Winger).

Terms of Endearment was theatrically released in limited theatres on November 23, 1983, and to a wider release on December 9 by Paramount Pictures. The film received critical acclaim and was a major commercial success, grossing $165 million at the box office, becoming the second-highest-grossing film of 1983. The film received a leading eleven nominations at the 56th Academy Awards, and won five (more than any other film nominated that year): Best Picture, Best Director, Best Actress (for MacLaine), Best Adapted Screenplay, and Best Supporting Actor (for Nicholson). A sequel, The Evening Star, was released in 1996.

Plot
Widowed Aurora Greenway keeps several suitors at arm's length in River Oaks, Houston, focusing instead on her close, but controlling, relationship with daughter Emma. Anxious to escape her mother, Emma marries callow young college professor Flap Horton over her mother's objections. Despite their frequent spats and difficulty getting along with each other, Emma and Aurora have very close ties and keep in touch by telephone.

Emma and Flap move to Iowa in order for him to pursue a career as an English professor, but they run into financial difficulties. Emma has three children, and over the course of the next few years the marriage begins to fray. While at the grocery store, Emma does not have the money to pay for her groceries and meets Sam Burns, who pays for them. They strike up a friendship and quickly an affair as Sam's wife refuses to have sex with him and Emma suspects Flap of infidelity.  Meanwhile, the lonely Aurora overcomes her repression and begins a whirlwind romance with her next-door neighbor, retired astronaut Garrett Breedlove. Emma catches Flap flirting with one of his students and drives back to Texas immediately. There, Garrett develops cold feet about his relationship with Aurora and breaks it off. While Emma is gone, Flap decides to take a promotion in Nebraska; Emma and the children return to Iowa, and they move to Nebraska.

Emma finds out Flap moved them to Nebraska so he could work with his girlfriend. Emma is diagnosed with cancer, which becomes terminal. Aurora and Flap stay by Emma's side through her treatment and hospitalization. Garrett flies to Nebraska to be with Aurora and the family during this. The dying Emma shows her love for her mother by entrusting her children to Aurora's care.

Cast

Production
Brooks wrote the supporting role of Garrett Breedlove for Burt Reynolds, who turned down the role because of a verbal commitment he had made to appear in Stroker Ace. "There are no awards in Hollywood for being an idiot", Reynolds later said of the decision. Harrison Ford and Paul Newman also turned down the role.

The exterior shots of Aurora Greenway's home were filmed at 3060 Locke Lane, Houston, Texas. The exterior shots of locations intended to be in Des Moines, Iowa and Kearney, Nebraska were instead filmed in Lincoln, Nebraska. Many scenes were filmed on, or near, the campus of the University of Nebraska-Lincoln. While filming in Lincoln, the state capital, Winger met then-governor of Nebraska Bob Kerrey; the two wound up dating for two years.

MacLaine and Winger reportedly did not get along with each other during production. MacLaine confirmed in an interview that "it was a very tough shoot ... Chaotic...(Jim) likes working with tension on the set."

On working with Nicholson, MacLaine said, "Working with Jack Nicholson was crazy", but that his spontaneity may have contributed to her performance. She also said,We're like old smoothies working together. You know the old smoothies they used to show whenever you went to the Ice Follies. They would have this elderly man and woman – who at that time were 40 – and they had a little bit too much weight around the waist and were moving a little slower. But they danced so elegantly and so in synch with each other that the audience just laid back and sort of sighed. That's the way it is working with Jack. We both know what the other is going to do. And we don't socialize, or anything. It's an amazing chemistry – a wonderful, wonderful feeling.

MacLaine also confirmed in an interview with USA Today that Nicholson improvised when he put his hand down her dress in the beach scene.

Reception

Box office
Terms of Endearment was commercially successful. On its opening weekend, it grossed $3.4 million, ranking number two at the US box office, until its second weekend, when it grossed $3.1 million, ranking number one at the box office. Three weekends later, it arrived number one again, with $9,000,000, having wide release. For four weekends, it remained number one at the box office, until slipping to number two on its tenth weekend. On the film's 11th weekend, it arrived number one (for the sixth and final time), grossing $3,000,000. For the last weekends of the film, it later dwindled downward. The film grossed $108,423,489 in the United States and Canada and $165 million worldwide.

Critical reception
Terms of Endearment received critical acclaim at the time of its release. On Rotten Tomatoes, the film has an 81% approval rating based on 106 reviews, with a weighted average of 7.8/10. The site's consensus reads: "A classic tearjerker, Terms of Endearment isn't shy about reaching for the heartstrings – but is so well-acted and smartly scripted that it's almost impossible to resist." Metacritic reports a score of 79/100 based on reviews from ten critics, indicating "Generally favorable reviews". 

Roger Ebert gave the film a four-out-of-four star rating, calling it "a wonderful film" and stating, "There isn't a thing that I would change, and I was exhilarated by the freedom it gives itself to move from the high comedy of Nicholson's best moments to the acting of Debra Winger in the closing scenes." Gene Siskel, who gave the film a highly enthusiastic review, correctly predicted upon its release that it would go on to win the Academy Award for Best Picture of 1983. 

In his movie guide, Leonard Maltin awarded the film a rare four-star rating, calling it a "Wonderful mix of humor and heartache", and concluded the film was "Consistently offbeat and unpredictable, with exceptional performances by all three stars".

Awards and nominations
As of July 2022, Nicholson is one of the few supporting actors to ever sweep "The Big Four" critics awards (LA, NBR, NY, NSFC) for his performance of Garrett Breedlove.

American Film Institute (nominations):
 AFI's 100 Years...100 Movies
 AFI's 100 Years...100 Laughs
 AFI's 100 Years...100 Movie Quotes:
 Aurora: "Would you like to come in?" Garrett: "I'd rather stick needles in my eyes."
 AFI's 100 Years...100 Movies (10th Anniversary Edition)

Sequel
A sequel to the film, The Evening Star (1996), in which MacLaine and Nicholson reprised their roles, was a critical and commercial failure.

Notes

References

External links

 
 
 

1983 films
1980s romantic comedy-drama films
American romantic comedy-drama films
Best Drama Picture Golden Globe winners
Best Picture Academy Award winners
1980s English-language films
Films about adultery in the United States
Films about astronauts
Films about cancer
Films about death
Films about dysfunctional families
Films based on American novels
Films based on romance novels
Films directed by James L. Brooks
Films featuring a Best Actress Academy Award-winning performance
Films featuring a Best Supporting Actor Academy Award-winning performance
Films featuring a Best Drama Actress Golden Globe-winning performance
Films featuring a Best Supporting Actor Golden Globe winning performance
Films produced by James L. Brooks
Films set in the 1960s
Films set in the 1970s
Films set in the 1980s
Films set in Nebraska
Films set in Iowa
Films set in New York City
Films set in Texas
Films shot in Houston
Films shot in Nebraska
Films whose director won the Best Directing Academy Award
Films whose writer won the Best Adapted Screenplay Academy Award
Films with screenplays by James L. Brooks
Paramount Pictures films
1983 directorial debut films
1983 comedy films
1983 drama films
Films about mother–daughter relationships
1980s American films